The Dagens Nyheter Tower, called DN-Skrapan (DN-Skyscraper) in Sweden, is an office building in the Kungsholmen district of Stockholm, Sweden. It is eighty four metres (276 ft.) tall and has 27 floors, none of which are underground. It was completed in 1964 and was designed by architect Paul Hedqvist.

It originally was home to Dagens Nyheter, Sweden's largest daily newspaper however in the 1990s, the newspaper moved its offices to a smaller building located in the same complex. The newspaper Expressen is also located in that building. Today, the major building is used by different companies.

External links

Buildings and structures in Stockholm
Towers in Sweden
Office buildings completed in 1964
Newspaper headquarters
Skyscraper office buildings in Sweden